The Philopotamoidea are a superfamily level taxon of the order Trichoptera which contains two caddisfly families.

Trichoptera
Insect superfamilies